Ajitke Chattha (also spelled Ajit Kay Chattha and Ajitkay Chattha) is a village located in Wazirabad Tehsil, Gujranwala District, Punjab, Pakistan.

Demography 
Ajitke Chattha had a population of 1,194 in 2017.

Education 
A government school is located in Ajitke Chattha. It is run by the Government of Punjab, Pakistan under the Board of Intermediate and Secondary Education, Gujranwala. For higher-level education, some students move to Kalaske Cheema, Dilawar Cheema and Ali Pur Chatta. For higher university level education, students move to Gujranwala, Gujrat, Pakistan and Lahore. Some private schools are located near this village, including:

 Government Girls Elementary School (GGES), Ajitke Chattha
 Government Boys Elementary School (GES), Ajitke Chattha

Communication 
The only way to get to Ajitke Chattha is by road. This village is directly connected to the Gujranwala-Ali Pur Chattha road. Besides driving a car, the only other method of transport near this village is a train. The Wazirabad-Faisalabad rail link is the only nearby railway line, and Rasool Nagar is the nearest railway station. The villagers share post office of Jham Wala.

See also 
 Dharam Kot
 Pindori Kalan
 Pindori Khurd

References 

Villages in Gujranwala District